Scott William Brooks (born July 31, 1965) is an American professional basketball coach and former player who is the top assistant coach for the Portland Trail Blazers of the National Basketball Association (NBA). He played point guard at San Joaquin Delta College and Texas Christian University before playing his last two years at the University of California, Irvine. He was inducted into UCI's Hall of Fame in 2001.

Early life and college
Born in French Camp, California on July 31, 1965, Brooks graduated from East Union High School at Manteca, California in 1983. As a freshman, he played college basketball at Texas Christian University for a season and then transferred for his sophomore year to San Joaquin Delta College in Stockton, California, about 10 miles from his parents' home in Lathrop, California. One highlight of his year at TCU was being assigned the task of "fronting" Hakeem Olajuwon. After only being offered a walk-on spot by nearby University of the Pacific, he declined that offer and spent the next two years at the University of California, Irvine. In his senior season at UCI, he averaged 23.8 points and made 43.2% of his three-point attempts. On the night that the Bren Events Center opened at UC Irvine on January 8, 1987, Brooks scored 43 points as UCI defeated Utah State, 118–96. He scored 41 points in a 90–79 win at University of the Pacific later that season to tie the Spanos Center scoring record. Brooks was inducted to the UC Irvine Hall of Fame in 2001 and had his jersey No. 12 retired on November 30, 2019.

Professional career

Playing and early coaching career
After not being drafted in the 1987 NBA Draft, Brooks debuted professionally with the Albany Patroons of the Continental Basketball Association under coach Bill Musselman. Brooks was named to the CBA's all-rookie team in 1988 and was a member of Albany's CBA Championship team that same season. Later, he played for the Fresno Flames of the World Basketball League.

Brooks played 10 seasons (1988–1998) in the NBA, appearing as a member of the Philadelphia 76ers, Minnesota Timberwolves, Houston Rockets, Dallas Mavericks, New York Knicks and Cleveland Cavaliers, and was a member of Houston's 1994 NBA Championship team. In 1995, he was traded to the Mavericks for Morlon Wiley and a second-round pick in the only trade deadline deal of the season. Brooks signed with the Los Angeles Clippers before the 1998–99 season but sat out due to a right knee injury. The Clippers waived Brooks on February 19, 1999, re-signed him, then released Brooks in October 1999, during the 1999–2000 preseason.

Coaching career 
Brooks joined the Los Angeles Stars of the American Basketball Association (ABA) in 2000–01, where he was both a player and an assistant coach.

Seattle SuperSonics / Oklahoma City Thunder (2007–2015)
After serving as an assistant coach with the Sacramento Kings and Denver Nuggets, Brooks was named an assistant to P. J. Carlesimo with the Seattle SuperSonics before the 2007–08 season, and followed the team to Oklahoma City as the Thunder after that season. When Carlesimo was fired on November 22, 2008; Brooks was named interim coach for the rest of the season. On April 22, 2009, the Thunder named him the 15th head coach in the Sonics/Thunder history.

Brooks got off to one of the best starts for a rookie head coach in recent NBA history. He led the Thunder to the playoffs in his first five full seasons with the team. He was named the 2009–10 NBA Coach of the Year after leading the Thunder to a 50-win season and the 8th seed in the Western Conference for the playoffs, a 28-win increase over the previous season. On February 11, 2012, Brooks was named the Western Conference All-Star Coach for the 2012 NBA All-Star Game in Orlando, Florida. In the shortened 66-game 2011–12 season, he led the Thunder to the NBA Finals, where they eventually lost to the 2012 NBA Champions, the Miami Heat. In the 2012 offseason, the Thunder signed Brooks to a multi-year head coaching contract reportedly worth about $18 million.

On January 29, 2014, Brooks was named the Western Conference All-Star Coach for the 2014 NBA All-Star Game in New Orleans.

On April 22, 2015, Brooks was fired by the Thunder a week after the team missed the playoffs for the first time in his six full seasons as head coach. He left as the coach with the third-most wins in the Sonics/Thunder history, behind only Lenny Wilkens and George Karl.

It was reported by Adrian Wojnarowski in May that Brooks did not wish to interview for other coaching opportunities for the 2015–16 season, instead desiring to take a break and reconnect with family living in California.

Washington Wizards (2016–2021)

On April 26, 2016, Brooks was hired by the Washington Wizards, becoming the 24th head coach in franchise history.

He altered the team's culture in the off-season and met with several players. In their first season with Brooks at the helm, the Wizards made it to the NBA playoffs, beating the Atlanta Hawks in the first round, before losing in seven games to the Boston Celtics in the second round. While they also made the playoffs the next year, Washington lost in six games in the first round to the Toronto Raptors, and then missed the playoffs entirely the next two seasons. In Brooks's fifth year as head coach, the team made it to the playoffs as a play-in team, but suffered a first round exit to the Philadelphia 76ers. 

On June 16, 2021, the Wizards and Brooks parted ways after his contract expired.

Portland Trail Blazers (2021–present)
On August 2, 2021, Brooks was hired by the Portland Trail Blazers as the assistant coach to Chauncey Billups.

Head coaching record

|-
| align="left" |Oklahoma City
| align="left" |
|69||22||47|||| align="center" |5th in Northwest||—||—||—||—
| align="center" |Missed Playoffs
|-
| align="left" |Oklahoma City
| align="left" |
|82||50||32|||| align="center" |4th in Northwest||6||2||4||
| align="center" |Lost in First Round
|-
| align="left" |Oklahoma City
| align="left" |
|82||55||27|||| align="center" |1st in Northwest||17||9||8||
| align="center" |Lost in Conference Finals
|-
| align="left" |Oklahoma City
| align="left" |
|66||47||19|||| align="center" |1st in Northwest||20||13||7||
| align="center" |Lost in NBA Finals
|-
| align="left" |Oklahoma City
| align="left" |
|82||60||22||||| align="center" |1st in Northwest||11||5||6||
| align="center" |Lost in Conference Semifinals
|-
| align="left" |Oklahoma City
| align="left" |
|82||59||23||||| align="center" |1st in Northwest||19||10||9||
| align="center" |Lost in Conference Finals
|-
| align="left" |Oklahoma City
| align="left" |
|82||45||37|||| align="center" |2nd in Northwest||—||—||—||—
| align="center" |Missed playoffs
|-
| align="left" |Washington
| align="left" |
|82||49||33||||| align="center" |1st in Southeast||13||7||6||
| align="center" |Lost in Conference Semifinals
|-
| align="left" |Washington
| align="left" |
|82||43||39||||| align="center" |2nd in Southeast||6||2||4||
| align="center" |Lost in First Round
|-
| align="left" |Washington
| align="left" |
|82||32||50||||| align="center" |4th in Southeast||—||—||—||—
| align="center" |Missed playoffs
|-
| align="left" |Washington
| align="left" |
|72||25||47||||| align="center" |3rd in Southeast||—||—||—||—
| align="center" |Missed playoffs
|-
| align="left" |Washington
| align="left" |
|72||34||38||||| align="center" |3rd in Southeast||5||1||4||
| align="center" |Lost in First Round
|-class="sortbottom"
| align="center" colspan="2"|Career
|935||521||414|||| ||97||49||48||||

Notes

External links

  at NBA.com
 Scott Brooks coach biography at NBA.com
 bbr as coach

1965 births
Living people
Albany Patroons players
American men's basketball players
Basketball coaches from California
Basketball players from California
Cleveland Cavaliers players
Dallas Mavericks players
Denver Nuggets assistant coaches
Houston Rockets players
Junior college men's basketball players in the United States
Minnesota Timberwolves players
New York Knicks players
Oklahoma City Thunder assistant coaches
Oklahoma City Thunder head coaches
People from French Camp, California
Philadelphia 76ers players
Point guards
Sacramento Kings assistant coaches
San Joaquin Delta College alumni
Seattle SuperSonics assistant coaches
TCU Horned Frogs men's basketball players
UC Irvine Anteaters men's basketball players
Undrafted National Basketball Association players
Washington Wizards head coaches